The 1880 United Kingdom general election was a general election in the United Kingdom held from 31 March to 27 April 1880.

Its intense rhetoric was led by the Midlothian campaign of the Liberals, particularly the fierce oratory of Liberal leader William Gladstone. He vehemently attacked the foreign policy of the government of Benjamin Disraeli, Earl of Beaconsfield, as utterly immoral.

Liberals secured one of their largest-ever majorities, leaving the Conservatives a distant second. As a result of the campaign, the Liberal Commons leader, Lord Hartington (heir apparent to the Duke of Devonshire) and that in the Lords, Lord Granville, stood back in favour of Gladstone, who thus became Prime Minister a second time. It was the last general election in which any party other than the Conservatives won a majority of the votes (rather than a plurality).

Results summary

|}

Voting summary

Seats summary

Issues

The Conservative government was doomed by the poor condition of the British economy and the vulnerability of its foreign policy to moralistic attacks by the Liberals. William Gladstone, appealing to moralistic evangelicals, led the attack on the foreign policy of Benjamin Disraeli (now known as Lord Beaconsfield) as immoral. Historian Paul Smith paraphrases the rhetorical tone which focused on attacking "Beaconsfieldism" (in Smith's words) as a:

Smith notes that there was indeed some substance to the allegations, but: "Most of this was partisan extravaganza, worthy of its target's own excursions against the Whigs."

Disraeli himself was now the Earl of Beaconsfield in the House of Lords, and custom did not allow peers to campaign. His party was unable to deal effectively with the rhetorical onslaught. Although he had improved the organisation of the Conservative Party, Disraeli was firmly based in the rural gentry,  and had little contact with or understanding of the urban middle class that was increasingly dominating his party.

Besides their trouble with foreign policy issues, it was even more important that the Conservatives were unable to effectively defend their economic record on the home front. The 1870s coincided with a long-term global depression caused by the collapse of the worldwide railway boom of the 1870s which previously had been so profitable to Britain. The stress was growing by the late 1870s; prices fell, profits fell, employment fell, and there was downward pressure on wage rates that caused much hardship among the industrial working class. The free trade system supported by both parties made Britain defenceless against the flood of cheap wheat from North America, which was exacerbated by the worst harvest of the century in Britain in 1879. The party in power got the blame, and Liberals repeatedly emphasised the growing budget deficit as a measure of bad stewardship. In the election itself, Disraeli's party lost heavily up and down the line, especially in Scotland and Ireland, and in the urban boroughs. His Conservative strength fell from 351 to 238, while the Liberals jumped from 250 to 353. Disraeli resigned on 21 April 1880.

Regional results

Great Britain

England

Scotland

Wales

Ireland

Universities

See also
List of MPs elected in the 1880 United Kingdom general election
1880 United Kingdom general election in Ireland
1880 United Kingdom general election in Scotland

References

Sources and further reading

 Chilston, Viscount. "The 1880 Election: A Historical Landmark." Parliamentary Affairs 14 (June 1961): 477-492.

 Lloyd, T.O. "The General Election of 1880 (Oxford UP, 1967)

 Roberts, Matthew. "Election Cartoons and Political Communication In Victorian England.' Cultural & Social History'' (2013) 10#3 pp 369–395, covers 1860 to 1890.

External links
Spartacus: Political Parties and Election Results

 
1880
 General election
March 1880 events
April 1880 events